"I Don't Wanna Lose You" is a song by American-Swiss singer Tina Turner. It was written by Albert Hammond and Graham Lyle and produced along with Roger Davies for Turner's seventh solo studio album, Foreign Affair (1989). It was released as the album's second single in the UK on November 6, 1989, and as third single in the rest of Europe and in Australia in early 1990. It became a top-10 hit in Belgium and the United Kingdom, where it peaked at  8 on the UK Singles Chart to become her fifth top-10 single there.

Critical reception
In an 2019 retrospective review, Matthew Hocter from Albumism stated that Turner "delivers some solid club tracks" on Foreign Affair, like "I Don't Wanna Lose You". Bil Carpenter from AllMusic complimented the song as "fine". Upon the release, Rufer & Fell from the Gavin Report commented, "Nothing but the best from Ms. Turner", describing it as "a declaration of possession sung by someone who's experienced her share of "have-nots" in the past." In an 2015 review, Pop Rescue declared it as a "great little track", noting Gary Barnacle's "well placed" blast of saxophone. William Shaw from Smash Hits said, "Actually this is quite good", "a simple, plain, slow yet still sort of perky love song that ambles along in an unsurprising way but which is actually rather charming all the same."

Track listings

 UK and Australian 7-inch and casssette single
 "I Don't Wanna Lose You" – 4:20
 "Not Enough Romance" – 4:04

 European 7-inch and CD single
 "I Don't Wanna Lose You" – 4:19
 "Steel Claw" (Live) – 4:32

 UK CD single
 "I Don't Wanna Lose You" – 4:20
 "Stronger Than The Wind" – 3:59
 "Not Enough Romance" – 4:04
 "We Don't Need Another Hero (Thunderdome)" – 4:16

 European CD and 12-inch single
 "I Don't Wanna Lose You" – 4:19
 "Steel Claw" (Live) – 4:32
 "The Best" (Extended Mighty Mix) – 6:33

 UK 12-inch single
 "I Don't Wanna Lose You" – 4:20
 "Stronger Than The Wind" – 3:59
 "Not Enough Romance" – 4:04

Charts

Weekly charts

Year-end charts

References

Tina Turner songs
1989 singles
1989 songs
Capitol Records singles
Music videos directed by Dominic Sena
Songs written by Albert Hammond
Songs written by Graham Lyle